Zach Whitecloud (born November 28, 1996) is a Canadian professional ice hockey defenceman who is currently playing with the Vegas Golden Knights of the National Hockey League (NHL). Of Dakota descent, Whitecloud went undrafted while playing for Bemidji State University. As a college free agent, he signed with the Golden Knights in 2018.

Playing career
During his second full season with the Virden Oil Capitals, Whitecloud announced his commitment to play hockey for Bemidji State University. Following his rookie year at Bemidji State, where he led defencemen in scoring, Whitecloud was invited to the Los Angeles Kings Development Camp before the 2017–18 NHL season. Following his sophomore year at Bemidji, Whitecloud was named the 2017–18 WCHA Scholar-Athlete and named to the WCHA All-Academic Team. He ended the season with 19 points and a team-best 51 blocked shots.

Whitecloud was signed by the Golden Knights to a three-year, $4.475 million entry-level contract on March 8, 2018. He played his first career NHL game on April 5, 2018 against the Edmonton Oilers. He finished with a team-best plus-3 in 16:42 of ice time in a 4–3 loss to the Oilers. Although the Golden Knights qualified for the 2018 Stanley Cup playoffs, Whitecloud was ineligible to be on the roster since he was not on the team's reserve list by the trade deadline.

While attending the Knights training camp prior to the 2018–19 season, Whitecloud was re-assigned to their American Hockey League affiliate, the Chicago Wolves.

Late in the 2019-20 season Whitecloud established himself with Vegas and he and teammate Nick Holden were one of the best duos in the playoffs in terms of defense and possession.

On October 28, 2021, Whitecloud signed a six-year, $16.5 million contract extension with the Golden Knights.

International play

Whitecloud was the youngest skater selected to play for Team Canada at the 2017 Karjala Cup in Finland. He was later named to Team Canada's pre-Olympic roster before the 2018 Winter Olympics but failed to make the final roster.

Personal life
Whitecloud was born in Brandon, Manitoba and raised in the Sioux Valley Dakota Nation. Growing up, he attended Vincent Massey High School from where he graduated in 2015.  He is of First Nations descent.

During the 2018 offseason, Whitecloud volunteered as a guest instructor at Micheal Ferland's Hockey School in Brandon, Manitoba, alongside Brigette Lacquette, Harley Garrioch, Jens Meilleur, Ryan Pulock, Tyler Plante, Shaq Merasty, Josh Elmes, and Joel Edmundson.

Career statistics

Regular season and playoffs

International

Awards and honors

References

External links

1996 births
Living people
Bemidji State Beavers men's ice hockey players
Canadian ice hockey defencemen
Chicago Wolves players
First Nations sportspeople
Ice hockey people from Manitoba
Portage Terriers players
Sportspeople from Brandon, Manitoba
Undrafted National Hockey League players
Vegas Golden Knights players
Virden Oil Capitals players